Rajindra Dhanraj (born  6 February 1969) was a cricket player for the West Indies. He played four Tests and six One Day Internationals. He was also successful playing for the Trinidad & Tobago team.

Career
Dhanraj was a prolific wicket taker at regional level throughout the 1990s, finishing with 295 first class wickets at an average of 27.10. His four Test appearances, spread out over four different series, yielded eight wickets at 74 apiece. 

Dhanraj holds the world record for lowest bowling average in List A cricket among players with over 50 scalps, with his 79 victims costing just 15.83 apiece. Despite a good showing during his brief ODI career, he was limited to just six appearances in the format. He also boasts the lowest ODI bowling average (17.00) among West Indian players with at least 10 wickets.

1969 births
Living people
West Indies Test cricketers
West Indies One Day International cricketers
Trinidad and Tobago cricketers
Trinidad and Tobago Hindus